This is a list of members of the Victorian Legislative Council from the elections of 8 September 1892 to the elections of 12 September 1895. No seats were contested in the elections of 13 September 1894.

From 1889 there were fourteen Provinces and a total of 48 members.
 

Note the "Term in Office" refers to that members term(s) in the Council, not necessarily for that Province.

James MacBain was President of the Council until 8 November 1892, William Zeal was President from 10 November 1892; Frank Dobson was Chairman of Committees.

 Benjamin resigned 12 September 1892; replaced by Robert Reid, sworn-in October 1892.
 MacBain died 4 November 1892; replaced by Matthew Lang, sworn-in December 1892.
 Pearson died 10 August 1893; replaced by Edward Crooke, sworn-in September 1893.
 Steinfeld died 16 April 1893; replaced by Thomas Wanliss, sworn-in July 1893.
 Wallace resigned November 1894; replaced by Joseph Grey, sworn-in December 1894.

References

 Re-member (a database of all Victorian MPs since 1851).

Members of the Parliament of Victoria by term
19th-century Australian politicians